Tiptree is a village in Essex, England. 

Tiptree may also refer to:

Tiptree United F.C., a former football club based in Tiptree
Tiptree railway station, a former railway station in Tiptree
James Tiptree, Jr., an American science fiction writer.
James Tiptree, Jr. Award, an annual science fiction award.
 Tiptree fruit preserves, the primary brand of Wilkin & Sons